My Eyes may refer to:
"My Eyes" (Fayray song), 2000
"My Eyes" (Blake Shelton song), 2014
"My Eyes" (Travis song), 2007
"My Eyes", a song in Dr. Horrible's Sing-Along Blog
"My Eyes", a 1990 song by Dio from Lock Up the Wolves